Chandramani Datta was a 13th-century Maithili writer born in Jitwarpur, Madhubani, Bihar, India 

Time of writing - 1265 AD (Mithilabhasha Ramayana). Manuscript recovered from Upendra Maharathi Shilpa Sansthan, Patna, Bihar, India.

Works
Datta is the author of:
 Mithilabhasha Ramayana (Total pages - 1200, with reference paintings / pictures)
 Mithilabhasha Mahabharata

Script - Mithilakshara / Tirhuta / Vaidehi Lipi

References

Maithili writers
Year of birth unknown
13th-century writers
Year of death unknown